Mickelover Royals F.C. was an English football club based in the Derby suburb of Mickleover in Derbyshire. The club last played in the East Midlands Counties League.

History
Mickleover Royals was formed in 2005 as an under 12s team, playing as Derby Royals. Three years later a men's team was formed. In 2011 the club joined the Midlands Regional Alliance. The following season the club changed its name to Mickleover Royals and was elected to the Central Midlands League, finishing in 6th place. The club made its debut in the FA Vase in the 2013–14 season. In the season 2014–15 Royals beat Basford United 1–0 with a 70th minute goal by Kirk Francis in the second preliminary round of the FA Vase, while they were promoted to the East Midlands Counties League by winning the Central Midlands League South Division. However, due to financial difficulties, they resigned four matches into the new season and the club folded. Their record was expunged.

Records
 Central Midlands League South Division
 Champions 2014–15
FA Vase
 Second Qualifying Round 2013–14
FA Vase
 Second Round Proper 2014–15

References

Defunct football clubs in Derbyshire
Association football clubs established in 2005
Sport in Derby
2005 establishments in England
East Midlands Counties Football League
Association football clubs disestablished in 2015
Central Midlands Football League
2015 disestablishments in England
Defunct football clubs in England